The 2015–16 California Golden Bears women's basketball team will represent University of California, Berkeley during the 2015–16 NCAA Division I women's basketball season. The Golden Bears, led by fifth year head coach Lindsay Gottlieb, play their home games at the Haas Pavilion and are members of the Pac-12 Conference. They finished the season 15–17, 4–14 in Pac-12 play to finish in tenth place. They advanced to the semifinals of the Pac-12 women's basketball tournament where they lost to UCLA. They missed the postseason for the first time since 2005.

Roster

Schedule

|-
!colspan=9 style="background:#010066; color:#FFCC33;"|Exhibition

|-
!colspan=9 style="background:#010066; color:#FFCC33;"|Non-Conference Regular Season

|-
!colspan=9 style="background:#010066; color:#FFCC33;"|Pac-12 Regular Season

|-
!colspan=9 style="background:#010066; color:#FFCC33;"| Pac-12 Women's Tournament

Rankings
2015–16 NCAA Division I women's basketball rankings

See also
2015–16 California Golden Bears men's basketball team

References

California Golden Bears women's basketball seasons
California
Golden Bear
Golden Bear